Frederick or Fred Hughes may refer to:

Frederick Hughes (1816–1889) of the Hughes baronets
Fred G. Hughes (1837–1911), American miner, gambler, and politician
Frederick Hughes (footballer) (1860–?), Welsh footballer
Frederick Hughes (sailor) (1866–1956), British Olympic sailor
F. W. Hughes (Fred William Hughes, 1869–1950), Australian businessman
Frederick Llewelyn Hughes (1894–1967), Anglican priest and British Army chaplain
Fred G. Hughes (newspaper publisher) (1915–1996), American newspaper publisher and FBI agent
Fred Hughes (rugby), 1940s Welsh rugby league footballer
Frederick W. Hughes (1943–2001), manager and executor of Andy Warhol
Fred Hughes (singer), 1960s American R&B singer

See also
Frederic Hughes (1858–1944), Australian World War I general